The 40th annual Toronto International Film Festival was held from 10 to 20 September 2015. On 28 July 2015 the first wave of films to be screened at the Festival was announced. Jean-Marc Vallée's Demolition starring Jake Gyllenhaal and Naomi Watts was the opening night film; Mr. Right by Paco Cabezas was the closing night film.

The year's edition included two new sections called Platform and Primetime. At Platform, twelve films will be screened in front of a jury, with the best film of the program winning the C$25,000 Platform Prize. Film directors Claire Denis, Jia Zhangke, and Agnieszka Holland were selected as the jurors for this section. At Primetime, six high-quality television programs will be presented at public screenings with Question and Answer sessions with show creators. The lineups for the TIFF Docs, Vanguard, Midnight Madness, and Masters sections were announced on 11 August 2015. More than 100 films were added to the festival's programme on 18 August. The new program titled In Conversation replaced the Maverick section.

The Festival reported that TIFF 2015 had a record high industry attendance, with 5,450 delegates from 80 countries, a 7% increase over 2014.

Awards
The festival's final awards were announced on 20 September.

Juries
Short film awards jury:
 Pascal Faure
 John Anderson
 Rizwan Manji

Canadian awards jury:
 Don McKellar
 Jacqueline Lyanga
 Ilda Santiago

FIPRESCI jury:
 Engin Ertan (president)
 Chris Alexander (film critic)
 Francisco Ferreira (film critic)
 Kerstin Gezelius
 Pierre Pageau
 Alissa Simon

NETPAC jury:
 Anne Misawa (chairperson)
 Heather Keung
 Nashen Moodley

Platform Prize jury (inaugural year):
 Jia Zhang-ke
 Claire Denis
 Agnieszka Holland

Programmes

Gala presentations
Beeba Boys by Deepa Mehta
Demolition by Jean-Marc Vallée
Disorder by Alice Winocour
The Dressmaker by Jocelyn Moorhouse
Eye in the Sky by Gavin Hood
Forsaken by Jon Cassar
Freeheld by Peter Sollett
Hyena Road by Paul Gross
Lolo by Julie Delpy	
Legend by Brian Helgeland	
Man Down by Dito Montiel
The Man Who Knew Infinity by Matt Brown (director)
The Martian by Ridley Scott
Miss You Already by Catherine Hardwicke
Mississippi Grind by Ryan Fleck and Anna Boden
Mr. Right by Paco Cabezas
The Program by Stephen Frears	
Remember by Atom Egoyan	
Septembers of Shiraz by Wayne Blair	
Stonewall by Roland Emmerich

Special Presentations
45 Years by Andrew Haigh
About Ray by Gaby Dellal
Angry Indian Goddesses by Pan Nalin
Anomalisa by Charlie Kaufman and Duke Johnson
Beasts of No Nation by Cary Fukunaga
Being Charlie by Rob Reiner
Black Mass by Scott Cooper
Body by Małgorzata Szumowska
Born to Be Blue by Robert Budreau
Brooklyn by John Crowley
The Club by Pablo Larraín
Colonia by Florian Gallenberger
The Danish Girl by Tom Hooper
The Daughter by Simon Stone
Desierto by Jonás Cuarón
Dheepan by Jacques Audiard
Equals by Drake Doremus
Families by Jean-Paul Rappeneau
The Family Fang by Jason Bateman
Guilty by Meghna Gulzar
I Saw the Light by Marc Abraham
I Smile Back by Adam Salky
Into the Forest by Patricia Rozema
The Idol by Hany Abu-Assad
The Lady in the Van by Nicholas Hytner
Len and Company by Tim Godsall
The Lobster by Yorgos Lanthimos
Louder Than Bombs by Joachim Trier
Ma Ma by Julio Medem 
Maggie's Plan by Rebecca Miller
Mia Madre by Nanni Moretti
The Meddler by Lorene Scafaria
Mountains May Depart by Jia Zhang-ke
Mr. Six by Guan Hu 
Mustang by Deniz Gamze Ergüven
Office by Johnnie To
Our Brand Is Crisis by David Gordon Green
Parched by Leena Yadav
Room by Lenny Abrahamson
Sicario by Denis Villeneuve
Son of Saul by László Nemes
Spotlight by Tom McCarthy
Summertime by Catherine Corsini
Sunset Song by Terence Davies
A Tale of Love and Darkness by Natalie Portman
A Tale of Three Cities by Mabel Cheung
Trumbo by Jay Roach
Truth by James Vanderbilt  
Un plus une by Claude Lelouch
Victoria by Sebastian Schipper
Ville-Marie by Guy Édoin
The Wave by Roar Uthaug 
Where to Invade Next by Michael Moore
The Witch by Robert Eggers
Youth by Paolo Sorrentino

Vanguard
Collective Invention by Kwon Oh-kwang
Demon by Marcin Wrona
Endorphine by André Turpin
Evolution by Lucile Hadžihalilović
February by Oz Perkins
Hellions by Bruce McDonald
Lace Crater by Harrison Atkins
Love by Gaspar Noé
Men & Chicken by Anders Thomas Jensen
The Missing Girl by A.D. Calvo
My Big Night by Álex de la Iglesia
The Nightmare by 
No Men Beyond This Point by Mark Sawers
Veteran by Ryoo Seung-wan
Zoom by Pedro Morelli

TIFF Docs
Al Purdy Was Here by Brian D. Johnson
A Flickering Truth by Pietra Brettkelly
Being AP by Anthony Wonke
Bolshoi Babylon by Nick Read
Dark Horse by Louise Osmond
Guantanamo's Child: Omar Khadr by Patrick Reed, Michelle Shephard
He Named Me Malala by Davis Guggenheim
Heart of a Dog by Laurie Anderson
Hitchcock/Truffaut by Kent Jones
Horizon by Bergur Bernburg, Friðrik Þór Friðriksson
In Jackson Heights by Frederick Wiseman
It All Started at the End by Luis Ospina
Janis: Little Girl Blue by Amy J. Berg
Je suis Charlie by Emmanuel Leconte, Daniel Leconte
A Journey of a Thousand Miles: Peacekeepers by Geeta Gandbhir, Sharmeen Obaid-Chinoy
Miss Sharon Jones! by Barbara Kopple
The Music of Strangers: Yo-Yo Ma and the Silk Road Ensemble by Morgan Neville
Nasser by Jihan El-Tahri
Ninth Floor by Mina Shum 
Our Last Tango by German Kral
P.S. Jerusalem by Danae Elon
The Reflektor Tapes by Kahlil Joseph
Return of the Atom by Mika Taanila, Jussi Eerola
Sherpa by Jennifer Peedom
This Changes Everything by Avi Lewis
Thru You Princess by Ido Haar
Welcome to F.L. by Geneviève Dulude-De Celles
Winter on Fire: Ukraine's Fight for Freedom by Evgeny Afineevsky
Women He's Undressed by Gillian Armstrong
A Young Patriot by Du Haibin

Short Cuts Canada
4 Quarters by Ashley McKenzie
Bacon and God's Wrath by Sol Friedman
The Ballad of Immortal Joe by Héctor Herrera
BAM by Howie Shia
Benjamin by Sherren Lee
Beyond the Horizon by Brian J. Noth
Boxing by Grayson Moore and Aidan Shipley
Boy by Connor Jessup
Bring Me the Head of Tim Horton by Guy Maddin, Evan Johnson and Galen Johnson
Casualties of Modernity by Kent Monkman
Clouds of Autumn by Trevor Mack and Matthew Taylor Blais
Dogs Don't Breed Cats (Les chiens ne font pas des chats) by Cristina Martins
Dredger by Phillip Baker
The Guy from New York by Jean-François LeBlanc
It's Not You by Don McKellar
Komkom by Kevin Papatie
A New Year by Marie-Ève Juste
O Negative by Steven McCarthy

Wavelengths
88:88 by Isiah Medina
Afternoon by Tsai Ming-liang
Arabian Nights: The Restless One by Miguel Gomes
Arabian Nights: The Desolate One by Miguel Gomes
Arabian Nights: The Enchanted One by Miguel Gomes
Bunte Kuh by Ryan Ferko, Parastoo Anoushahpour and Faraz Anoushahpour
Eva Doesn't Sleep by Pablo Agüero
The Event by Sergei Loznitsa
Engram of Returning by Daïchi Saïto
The Forbidden Room by Guy Maddin and Evan Johnson
Fugue by Kerstin Schroedinger]
Invention by Mark Lewis
La Giubba by Corin Sworn and Tony Romano
No Home Movie by Chantal Akerman
The Other Side by Roberto Minervini
The Sky Trembles and the Earth is Afraid and the Two Eyes Are Not Brothers by Ben Rivers

Discovery
A Patch of Fog by Michael Lennox
The Ardennes by Robin Pront
Beast by Tom McKeith and Sam McKeith
Black by Adil El Arbi and Bilall Fallah
Born to Dance by Tammy Davis
Closet Monster by Stephen Dunn
Dégradé by Arab Nasser and Tarzan Nasser
Desde allá by Lorenzo Vigas
Downriver by Grant Scicluna
Eva Nová by Marko Škop
Fire Song by Adam Garnet Jones
Five Nights in Maine by Maris Curran
The Here After by Magnus von Horn
Ixcanul by Jayro Bustamante
James White by Josh Mond
Keeper by Guillaume Senez
Les Cowboys by Thomas Bidegain
Meghmallar by Zahidur Rahim Anjan
Mountain by Yaelle Kayam
My Name Is Emily by Simon Fitzmaurice
The Paradise Suite by Joost van Ginkel
The Rainbow Kid by Kire Paputts
River by Jamie M. Dagg
Semana Santa by Alejandra Márquez Abella
Sleeping Giant by Andrew Cividino
Spear by Stephen Page
Very Big Shot by Mir-Jean Bou Chaaya
The Wait by Piero Messina
We Monsters by Sebastian Ko
Wedding Doll by Nitzan Gilady

Contemporary World Cinema
25 April by Leanne Pooley
3000 Nights by Mai Masri
An by Naomi Kawase
The Apostate by Federico Veiroj
As I Open My Eyes by Leyla Bouzid
Baba Joon by Yuval Delshad
Box by Florin Șerban
Campo Grande by Sandra Kogut
Chevalier by Athina Rachel Tsangari
A Copy of My Mind by Joko Anwar
Cuckold by Charlie Vundla
Embrace of the Serpent by Ciro Guerra
The Endless River by Oliver Hermanus
The Fear by Damien Odoul
Frenzy by Emin Alper
Girls Lost by Alexandra-Therese Keining
Granny's Dancing on the Table by Hanna Sköld
A Heavy Heart by Thomas Stuber
Homesick by Anne Sewitsky
Hong Kong Trilogy: Preschooled Preoccupied Preposterous by Christopher Doyle
Honor Thy Father by Erik Matti
How Heavy This Hammer by Kazik Radwanski
Invisible by Lawrence Fajardo
In the Room by Eric Khoo
Incident Light by Ariel Rotter
I Promise You Anarchy by Julio Hernández Cordón
Ivy by Tolga Karaçelik
Jack by Elisabeth Scharang
Journey to the Shore by Kiyoshi Kurosawa
The Kind Words by Shemi Zarhin
Koza by Ivan Ostrochovský
Lamb by Yared Zeleke
Last Cab to Darwin by Jeremy Sims
Let Them Come by Salem Brahimi
Magallanes by Salvador del Solar
Mekko by Sterlin Harjo
Much Loved by Nabil Ayouch
Murmur of the Hearts by Sylvia Chang
My Internship in Canada by Philippe Falardeau
One Breath by Christian Zübert
One Floor Below by Radu Muntean
Our Loved Ones by Anne Émond
Parisienne by Danielle Arbid
Paths of the Soul by Zhang Yang
The People vs. Fritz Bauer by Lars Kraume
Price of Love by Hermon Hailay
Rams by Grímur Hákonarson
Schneider vs. Bax by Alex van Warmerdam
Song of Songs by Eva Neymann
Sparrows by Runar Rúnarsson
Starve Your Dog by Hicham Lasri
The Steps by Andrew Currie
Story of Judas by Rabah Ameur-Zaïmeche
Stranger by Ermek Tursunov
Thank You for Bombing by Barbara Eder
The Treasure by Corneliu Porumboiu
Truman by Cesc Gay
The Waiting Room by Igor Drljaca
The Whispering Star by Sion Sono

Midnight Madness
Baskin by Can Evrenol
The Chickening by Davy Force and Nick DenBoer
The Devil's Candy by Sean Byrne
The Final Girls by Todd Strauss-Schulson
The Girl in the Photographs by Nick Simon
Green Room by Jeremy Saulnier
Hardcore by Ilya Naishuller
The Mind's Eye by Joe Begos
Southbound by Radio Silence, Roxanne Benjamin, David Bruckner & Patrick Horvath
SPL II: A Time For Consequences by Soi Cheang
Yakuza Apocalypse by Takashi Miike

Masters
11 Minutes by Jerzy Skolimowski
The Assassin by Hou Hsiao-hsien
Bleak Street by Arturo Ripstein
Blood of My Blood by Marco Bellocchio
Cemetery of Splendour by Apichatpong Weerasethakul
Every Thing Will Be Fine by Wim Wenders
Francofonia by Alexander Sokurov
In the Shadow of Women by Philippe Garrel
Our Little Sister by Hirokazu Kore-eda
The Pearl Button by Patricio Guzmán
Rabin, the Last Day by Amos Gitai
Right Now, Wrong Then by Hong Sang-soo
Taxi by Jafar Panahi

City to City: London
Couple in a Hole by Tom Geens
The Hard Stop by George Amponsah
Kill Your Friends by Owen Harris
Kilo Two Bravo by Paul Katis
London Road by Rufus Norris
Northern Soul by Elaine Constantine
The Ones Below by David Farr
Urban Hymn by Michael Caton-Jones

Cinematheque
Heat by Michael Mann

TIFF Kids
The Boy and the Beast by Mamoru Hosoda
The Iron Giant: Signature Edition by Brad Bird
My Skinny Sister by Sanna Lenken
Phantom Boy by Alain Gagnol and Jean-Loup Felicioli

Platform
Bang Gang (A Modern Love Story) by Eva Husson
The Clan by Pablo Trapero
French Blood by Diastème
Full Contact by David Verbeek
High-Rise by Ben Wheatley
Hurt by Alan Zweig
Land of Mine by Martin Zandvliet
Looking for Grace by Sue Brooks
Neon Bull by Gabriel Mascaro
The Promised Land by He Ping
Sky by Fabienne Berthaud
The White Knights by Joachim Lafosse

Primetime
Casual by Zander Lehmann
Heroes Reborn by Tim Kring
Cromo by Lucía Puenzo and Nicolás Puenzo
Keith Richards: Under the Influence by Morgan Neville
The Returned by  Fabrice Gobert
Trapped by Baltasar Kormákur

Wavelengths
88:88 by Isiah Medina

Canada's Top Ten
In December, TIFF programmers released their annual Canada's Top Ten list of the films selected as the ten best Canadian films of 2015. The selected films received a follow-up screening at the TIFF Bell Lightbox as a "Canada's Top Ten" minifestival in January 2016, as well as in selected other cities including Ottawa, Montreal and Halifax.

Features

Shorts

References

External links

 
 Official Film Schedule
 Official web site, 2015 TIFF (as archived by Internet Archive Wayback Machine on 5 September 2015)
 TOfilmfest (unofficial guide to TIFF 2015)

2015
2015 film festivals
2015 in Toronto
2015 in Canadian cinema
2015 festivals in North America